An energy landscape is a mapping of possible states of a system. The concept is frequently used in physics, chemistry, and biochemistry, e.g. to describe all possible conformations of a molecular entity, or the spatial positions of interacting molecules in a system, or parameters and their corresponding energy levels, typically Gibbs free energy. Geometrically, the energy landscape is the graph of the energy function across the configuration space of the system. The term is also used more generally in geometric perspectives to mathematical optimization, when the domain of the loss function is the parameter space of some system.

Applications 
The term is useful when examining protein folding; while a protein can theoretically exist in a nearly infinite number of conformations along its energy landscape, in reality proteins fold (or "relax") into secondary and tertiary structures that possess the lowest possible free energy.  The key concept in the energy landscape approach to protein folding is the folding funnel hypothesis.

In catalysis, when designing new catalysts or refining existing ones, energy landscapes are considered to avoid low-energy or high-energy intermediates that could halt the reaction or demand excessive energy to reach the final products.

In glassing models, the local minima of an energy landscape correspond to metastable low temperature states of a thermodynamic system.

In machine learning, artificial neural networks may be analyzed using analogous approaches. For example, a neural network may be able to perfectly fit the training set, corresponding to a global minimum of zero loss, but overfitting the model ("learning the noise" or "memorizing the training set"). Understanding when this happens can be studied using the geometry of the corresponding energy landscape.

Formal definition 

Mathematically, an energy landscape is a continuous function  associating each physical state with an energy, where  is a topological space.

In the continuous case, where  is the number of degrees of freedom of the system.

Macroscopic example 

A well-oiled door hinge has one degree of freedom, so its energy landscape is a function . If the door hinge isn't mounted perfectly, the door will naturally swing closed, open, or to some partially open angle when it is allowed to swing freely. These angles correspond to states of minimal energy of the system, or valleys in the energy landscape.

See also 
 Potential energy surface
 Potential well

References 

Biochemistry